Panikoili is a town in Jajpur district of Odisha state of eastern India.

It lies at the crossing of National Highway 16 and National Highway 20 (Previously NH 215). The closest significant towns are Jajpur and Keonjhar Road (now known as Byasanagar), about 10 km away. It lies on the center of Jajpur district. 
Panikoili is also the Police headquarter of Jajpur district.

Cities and towns in Jajpur district